Stoned Raiders is the sixth studio album by American hip hop group Cypress Hill, released on December 4, 2001 by Columbia Records.

Background
This album is best known for its two singles: "Trouble" and "Lowrider". The song "Kronologik" also summarizes Cypress Hill's career from their debut in 1991 until the album was released. Many of its songs feature guest artists like MC Ren, King Tee, Redman and Method Man.

"Here Is Something You Can't Understand", is a sequel of their breakthrough single, "How I Could Just Kill a Man". "Lowrider" was performed by the group in the film "How High" starring Method Man & Redman, and is also used on the British TV Series Soccer AM.

The album title was taken from the song of the same name from the group's third album Cypress Hill III: Temples of Boom, released in 1995.

Reception

Mixmag – 3 out of 5 – "They seem to be searching for new sounds and styles and this explains the multi-personality nature of the album way better than the ubiquitous chronic."
Vibe – 3.5 discs out of 5 – "Cypress Hill proves that where there's blunt smoke, there's fire. The quartet's hip hop joints haven't been this potent in years."
Kludge listed it as one of the 25 best albums of 2001.

Track listing
All tracks produced by DJ Muggs

Personnel
Scott Abels - drums on Intro and Bitter

B-Real – vocals
Sen Dog – vocals
DJ Muggs – arranger, producer, mixing
Gerard Babitts – A&R
Eric Bobo – drums
Jeremy Fleener – guitar
Brian Gardner – mastering
Sonny Gerasimowicz – design

King Tee – vocals
Kokane – vocals
Kurupt – vocals
Rogelio Lozano – guitar
MC Ren – vocals
Tracy McNew – project coordinator
Method Man – vocals

Jessica Moss – vocals
Estavan Oriol – design, photography
Redman – vocals
Mike Sims – guitar, Moog synthesizer
Troy Staton – engineer
Christian Olde Wolbers – bass guitar, guitar
Andy Zambrano – guitar

Charts

Weekly charts

Year-end charts

Certifications

References

2010 albums
Cypress Hill albums
Rap rock albums by American artists
Columbia Records albums
Albums produced by DJ Muggs